Johannes Lavik (1883 – 29 September 1952) was a Norwegian jurist, journalist and newspaper editor. He was born in Kvinnherad to the parliamentarian and revivalist Andreas Lavik. He edited the newspaper Dagen for more than thirty years, from 1919 to 1952.

References

1883 births
1952 deaths
People from Hordaland
Norwegian newspaper editors
People from Kvinnherad